White mahogany is a common name for several trees and may refer to:

Eucalyptus acmenoides, endemic to eastern Australia
Eucalyptus umbra, native to Australia
Khaya anthotheca, native to tropical Africa